Commandos is a stealth-oriented real-time tactics video game series. The five games released between 1998 and 2006 are all set during World War II and follow the adventures of a fictional Allied commando unit. Each mission is loosely based on historical events during World War II to carry the plot. The series was developed by the Spanish developer Pyro Studios and published by Eidos Interactive. The series has sold a total of 3.3 million copies and generated $41 million of revenue at retail.

Games

There are five games in the series, which are listed here in the order they were released:

Commandos: Behind Enemy Lines

Commandos: Behind Enemy Lines (CBEL) was released on 1 July 1998. It was published by Eidos Interactive, and developed by Pyro Studios. It features 20 missions. The view is isometric with tactical gameplay. A Sega Mega Drive/Genesis version of Commandos: Behind Enemy Lines, with the first 5 missions, was also made by Russian homebrew programmers, but lacked sound and certain other features of the PC version.

Commandos: Beyond the Call of Duty
Commandos: Beyond the Call of Duty, a set of new Commandos missions issued as a standalone game, was released on 31 March 1999. Despite it being much shorter than Behind Enemy Lines, it is a much more difficult game containing levels on a far greater scale to the extent of being comparable to those that were to be seen in Commandos 2. It has 8 missions, with locations including Yugoslavia and Greece.

Commandos 2: Men of Courage

A full sequel, released in 2001, was rebuilt with a 3D engine, more interactive environments, more skills for the commandos, and new characters. Like its predecessor, it drew heavily from war films and titled its levels in reference to such films as "The Bridge on the River Kwai" and "Saving Private Ryan". The game received even greater praise.

Several new characters were added to the series in this sequel: A thief called Paul "Lupin" Toledo, a dog called Whiskey and Wilson, a shot-down pilot claiming to be from the Light Brigade.

A remastered version of the game, called Commandos 2 - HD Remaster, was released in 2020 which was not well received by the audience.

Commandos 3: Destination Berlin

This is the third sequel in the series and was released in October 2003. In this game the mouse wheel can be used to rotate the player's vantage point. It was the first in the series to use a true 3D engine. However, the game has been criticized for its short missions and lack of hotkeys.

Commandos: Strike Force

Released during the first months of 2006, this game marks a diversion from the first three games. Although the missions are set up in a similar fashion (several different objectives, some to be achieved through stealth, others through use of force) and in most occasions the player is allowed to change between different characters, this is the first game in the series to apply a first-person perspective, like many Medal of Honor or Call of Duty games than to earlier entries of the series.

Strike Force only has three Commandos, making it the only game in the series to have the least amount of playable characters. They are the Green Beret, The Sniper and The Spy but they are not the same characters from previous instalments; they each bear different appearances, names, and skills.

The game attracted an overwhelmingly negative reaction, especially from fans of the earlier games in the series who saw this as a massive modification, concurrent with a great reduction in the series' trademark difficulty. Similarly, it was promoted as mixing elements of strategy from the past games with traditional first-person shooter game-play but instead only hinted at them whilst being predominantly action-oriented. As a result, both critics and fans felt it did little to distance itself from the recent flood of similar games.

Characters
The Commandos series is known to have different names for the characters. Depending on the region, each character's name and alias differs greatly. For example, the Green Beret's real name is either Jerry "Tiny" McHale or Jack "Butcher" O'Hara.

Cast

Music
The first Commandos game was composed by David Garcia-Morales Inés and other subsequent titles were done by Mateo Pascual. Each of the five soundtrack are made available on iTunes and Amazon.

Mods
Following the discontinuation of the series by Pyro Studios, a couple of mods have been developed by fans. Commandos: Strike in Narrow Path is a stand-alone expansion for Commandos: Behind Enemy Lines containing 9 missions and was released initially in 2010. Commandos 2: Destination Paris tweaks the gameplay of Commandos 2: Men Of Courage and adds over 100 missions to the base game.

Reception

Future
The series was acquired by Kalypso Media which published a remastered version of Commandos 2: Men of Courage in 2020 and announced work on a new game in the series in April 2020.

See also
Robin Hood: The Legend of Sherwood
Desperados: Wanted Dead or Alive
Desperados 2: Cooper's Revenge
Desperados III
Shadow Tactics: Blades of the Shogun
Star Trek: Away Team

Notes

References

Eidos Interactive games
Real-time tactics video games
Stealth video games
Video game franchises
Video games developed in Spain
Video games with isometric graphics
World War II video games
Video game franchises introduced in 1998